The Hulman Building (originally Central Union Bank it also became a Morris Plan Bank) is a ten-story art deco high rise in downtown Evansville, Indiana. Construction began in 1928 and was completed in 1930 with a brick facade of light yellow. It was the first of several Art Deco buildings to grace Evansville's skyline.

It was initially built as the new Central Union Bank Building and is listed on the National Register of Historic Places as "Morris Plan (Central Union Bank)". However, the bank failed on 11 January 1932 during the height of the Great Depression. It is more commonly known as the Hulman Building due to its subsequent ownership by the Hulman Family of Terre Haute, Indiana, former owners of the Indianapolis Motor Speedway.

The building was the headquarters of Vectren and its predecessor companies until May 2005, when Vectren's new headquarters was completed next to the Ohio River. It currently houses the Evansville Commerce Bank and a law firm, among others.

References 

Bank buildings on the National Register of Historic Places in Indiana
Art Deco architecture in Indiana
Commercial buildings completed in 1929
Buildings and structures in Evansville, Indiana
National Register of Historic Places in Evansville, Indiana